Long Day's Journey into Night is a play by Eugene O'Neill.

Long Day's Journey into Night may also refer to:

Films
Long Day's Journey into Night (1962 film), American adaptation
Long Day's Journey into Night (1973 film), British television adaptation
Long Day's Journey into Night (1982 film), television adaptation starring Ruby Dee
Long Day's Journey into Night (1987 film), television adaptation starring Jack Lemmon, Bethel Leslie, Peter Gallagher and Kevin Spacey
Long Day's Journey into Night (1996 film), Canadian adaptation
Long Day's Journey into Night (2018 film), Chinese film unrelated to the play

Television episodes
"Long Day's Journey into Night", 1986 season 2 Growing Pains episode
"Long Day's Journey into Night", 2014 season 2 Devious Maids episode
"Long Day's Journey", 2003 season 4 Angel episode